Gigi Fernández and Natasha Zvereva were the defending champions but they competed with different partners that year, Fernández with Martina Hingis and Zvereva with Lindsay Davenport.

Fernández and Hingis lost in the final 6–4, 6–3 against Davenport and Zvereva.

Seeds
Champion seeds are indicated in bold text while text in italics indicates the round in which those seeds were eliminated.

 Gigi Fernández /  Martina Hingis (final)
 Lindsay Davenport /  Natasha Zvereva (champions)
n/a
 Lisa Raymond /  Rennae Stubbs (quarterfinals)

Draw

External links
 1997 Toray Pan Pacific Open Doubles Draw

Pan Pacific Open
Toray Pan Pacific Open - Doubles
1997 Toray Pan Pacific Open